In-N-Out Records is a Japan-based record label. In Japan, it is home to Allister, Armor for Sleep, The Dear Hunter, and The Early November, among others.

Current bands 
 Fenix TX
 Finch
 Fight Fair
 Fireworks
 Halifax
 Home Grown
 I Am The Avalanche

See also 
 List of record labels

External links
 Official site
 Official Myspace

Japanese record labels